Emotional Intelligence: Why It Can Matter More Than IQ is a 1995 book by Daniel Goleman. In this book, Goleman posits that emotional intelligence is as important as IQ for success, including in academic, professional, social, and interpersonal aspects of one's life. Goleman says that emotional intelligence is a skill that can be taught and cultivated, and outlines methods for incorporating emotional skills training in school curriculum.

Emotional Intelligence was on The New York Times Best Seller list for a year and a half, a best-seller in many countries, and is in print worldwide in 40 languages.

References 

 
 

1995 non-fiction books
Bantam Books books
Books about emotions
Books about human intelligence
Books by Daniel Goleman
Emotional intelligence